Benjamin Philip Williams (born 27 August 1982) is an English former professional footballer who played as a goalkeeper.

He started his career at Manchester United, where he made pre-season appearances and was an unused substitute for a number of games. Williams was loaned out to several clubs, being Coventry City, Chesterfield, Altrincham and Crewe Alexandra.

Williams signed on a permanent deal with Crewe in 2004, after his release from Manchester United. He later played for Carlisle United, Colchester United, Hibernian, Bradford City, Bury, Blackpool and Bolton Wanderers.

Playing career

Manchester United
During the 2002–03 season, he was placed on the bench for the first team when Fabien Barthez was injured. He was loaned out to several clubs during his career, including spells at Coventry City, where he did not play a competitive game, and Chesterfield, who were down to just one goalkeeper when Carl Muggleton was ruled out for around six weeks with a double stress fracture of the fibula. Chesterfield manager Dave Rushbury said, "We must be doing something right because Manchester United don't let players out on loan unless they are confident they will be properly looked after. We have had the situation in hand following Carl Muggleton's injury and are delighted to welcome Ben Williams now that he is available to come on loan to us". Manchester United agreed to allow Williams to stay with the Spireites for a second month, following the news that first team goalkeeper, Carl Muggleton, was not expected to be fit for a further few weeks. In September 2003, he spent a month with Altrincham making six appearances.

Crewe Alexandra
In 2004, Williams was loaned out to Crewe Alexandra. Williams made 10 appearances for Crewe, conceding 14 goals and keeping two clean sheets during his loan spell. Williams' teammate, David Wright, told the Crewe website that "[Williams] is top drawer and I hope we can sign him for next year. He is young so he can only get better. He is a natural. He can catch the ball and also stops shots which he has no right to. He is an all-round good goalkeeper". In June 2004, Williams signed permanently for Crewe, following his release from Manchester United. In his second season with Crewe, he made 23 appearances. His third season with Crewe was cut short after Williams was diagnosed with meningitis, in the wake of which Crewe closed their training ground to prevent the spread of the disease. Williams made a full recovery a couple of months later.

His fourth season for the Railwaymen did not go according to plan; already three games into the season and Williams had conceded seven goals. However the keeper was trying to get back to his consistent form in which he impressed the majority of the Crewe faithful with his outstanding saves, and was hoping to break Clayton Ince's clean sheet record.

His contract expired in June 2008, and he rejected the offer of a new one from the club, so looked set to leave on a Bosman free transfer.

Carlisle United
On 25 June, Williams agreed terms with Carlisle United, who signed him as a replacement for the recently departed Keiren Westwood. Williams began his first (2008–09) season with Carlisle United as the team's first-choice goalkeeper. However, after making a few errors during the club's first few games of the season, he was soon dropped to the bench as the on-loan Ben Alnwick came into the side. Once Alnwick's loan period was over, Williams hoped to regain his first team spot, but Dutch keeper Tim Krul came in on loan from Newcastle United shortly after. Once Krul's loan period finished, Williams got a chance in the first team again, conceding four against Tranmere Rovers. His performances improved over the second half of the season, culminating in a clean sheet against Millwall (which helped Carlisle to avoid relegation) and coming second in the fan vote for player of the season as voted for in the local newspaper.

Colchester United
Williams signed for Colchester United for £60,000 on 10 July 2009. He made his debut in the opening game of the season, a 7–1 away win over Norwich City on 8 August 2009. His first clean sheet of the 2009–10 season came against Southampton in a 0–0 draw on 5 September 2009. He then kept a further 16 clean sheets during his debut season and has not only established himself as Colchester United's first-choice goalkeeper, but has also become a favourite with the U's faithful due to his assured, commanding performances. These solid performances led to Williams winning three Player of the Season Awards at the end of the 2009–10 season for Colchester United, including both the Colchester United Supporters Association (CUSA) home and away player of the year awards as voted for by fans, and also the Official Player of the Year Award. He decided to leave Colchester when his contract expired in June 2012; manager John Ward said that Williams wanted to play in the Championship.

Hibernian
On 10 July 2012, Williams signed a two-year contract with Scottish side Hibernian. During the 2012–13 season, Williams has saved five opposition penalty kicks. Williams won the player of the year award made by the Hibs Supporters' Association for 2012–13, ahead of regular goalscorer Leigh Griffiths. Hibs suffered relegation in the 2013–14 season, after which Williams was released at the end of his contract.

Bradford City
Williams signed for Bradford City in August 2014. He made his debut on 12 August, keeping a clean sheet as Bradford beat Morecambe 1–0 in the first round of the League Cup.

Bury
Williams moved to Bury in June 2016.

Blackpool
Williams signed for Blackpool on 3 July 2017. He was released by Blackpool at the end of the 2017–18 season.

Bolton Wanderers

On 3 August 2018 it was announced that Williams would be registered as goalkeeping back-up for Bolton Wanderers, where he worked as the Academy Goalkeeping Coach. At the end of the 2018–19 season, he reverted to his old role coaching the Bolton Wanderers Academy goalkeepers.

Coaching career

In February 2018, he replaced Dave Timmins as the goalkeeper coach at Blackpool with whom he was still playing for at the time.

In July 2018, he was working as a goalkeeper coach for the Bolton Wanderers Academy and even turned out for the first team in a friendly against Guiseley to cover for regular goalkeeper Ben Alnwick.

Despite being named as a substitute on numerous occasions, he did not make any appearances for the Bolton first team in the 2018–19 season and reverted to his old youth coaching role that summer, often stepping up to assist Lee Butler and later Mike Pollitt with first team duties. He left Bolton on 29 January 2021.

Career statistics

Notes

References

1982 births
Living people
Footballers from Manchester
Association football goalkeepers
English footballers
Manchester United F.C. players
Coventry City F.C. players
Chesterfield F.C. players
Crewe Alexandra F.C. players
Carlisle United F.C. players
Colchester United F.C. players
Hibernian F.C. players
English Football League players
Scottish Premier League players
Scottish Professional Football League players
Bradford City A.F.C. players
Bury F.C. players
Blackpool F.C. players
Bolton Wanderers F.C. players
Blackpool F.C. non-playing staff
Bolton Wanderers F.C. non-playing staff